Gouher Sultana (born 31 March 1988) is an Indian cricketer. Sultana was born in Hyderabad.  She has played international cricket for India's Under-21 women's team, and the India national women's cricket team, mainly as a left-arm orthodox spin bowler.

She has played in 23 One-day Internationals since her debut against Pakistan in the Women's Asia Cup at Kurunegala on 5 May 2008, including the 2009 Women's Cricket World Cup.  She has also played in seven Twenty20 Internationals since her debut against Australia in Sydney on 28 October 2008.

She along with Amita Sharma holds the record for the highest ever 10th wicket partnership in Women's ODI history(58)

References

External links

1988 births
Living people
Indian women cricketers
India women One Day International cricketers
India women Twenty20 International cricketers
Cricketers from Hyderabad, India
Sportswomen from Hyderabad, India
Hyderabad women cricketers
Pondicherry women cricketers
21st-century Indian women
21st-century Indian people